Max Born was a scientist who worked in many fields. Below is a list of things named in his honour.

Chemistry
Born–Haber cycle
Born–Landé equation
Born–Mayer equation
Born equation

Physics
BBGKY hierarchy (Bogoliubov–Born–Green–Kirkwood–Yvon hierarchy) 
Born–Oppenheimer approximation
Born–Huang approximation
Born–Infeld model
Born–von Karman boundary condition
 Born approximation, see Born series
Born coordinates
Born equation
Born law, see Born rule
Born probability
Born reciprocity
Born rigidity
Born rule
Born series
Born square
Cauchy-Born rule

Astronomical objects
Born (crater)
13954 Born, asteroid

Others
 Max Born Medal and Prize of the German Physical Society and the British Institute of Physics, created in 1972.
Max Born Award, given by The Optical Society.
 Max-Born Institut für Nichtlineare Optik und Kurzzeitspektroskopie im Forschungsverbund Berlin e.V. - Institute named in his honour.

Citations

Born,Max
Born, Max
Named after